is a Japanese professional wrestler currently signed to the Japanese professional wrestling promotion Tokyo Joshi Pro Wrestling where she is a former International Princess Champion.

Professional wrestling career

Independent circuit (2018-present)
At CyberFight Festival 2021, a cross-over event promoted by TJPW in partnership with DDT Pro Wrestling and Pro Wrestling Noah on June 6, Noa teamed up with Mizuki and Yuki Arai in a losing effort against Saitama Itoh Respect Army (Maki Itoh, Yuki Kamifuku and Marika Kobashi).

DDT Pro Wrestling (2018-present)
Due to Tokyo Joshi Pro Wrestling being the sister promotion of DDT, Noa is known for her sporadic appearances in the latter federation. At DDT Street Wrestling In Tokyo Dome Returns on October 31, 2021, she competed in a gauntlet tag team match where she teamed up with Hyper Misao to face the teams of The 37KAMIINA (Konosuke Takeshita, Mao, Shunma Katsumata and Yuki Ueno), Brahman Brothers (Brahman Kei and Brahman Shu), Chris Brookes and Gorgeous Matsuno, 121000000 (Maki Ito and Miyu Yamashita), Pheromones (Danshoku Dino, Yuki Iino and Yumehito Imanari) and Tetsuya Endo, and Kazuki Hirata, Kazusada Higuchi, Kouzi and Shinya Aoki.

Noa is also known for competing in various of DDT's signature events. As for the DDT Peter Pan branch of events, she made her first appearance at Wrestle Peter Pan 2021 on August 21 where she teamed up with Kuro-chan, Super Sasadango Machine and Tetsuhiro Kuroda in a losing effort against Atsushi Onita, Sanshiro Takagi, Akito and Maki Itoh as a result of a Electric Current Explosion eight-person Deathmatch.

Tokyo Joshi Pro Wrestling (2018-present)
Noa made her professional wrestling debut at TJPW Tokyo Joshi Pro '18 , an event promoted by Tokyo Joshi Pro Wrestling on January 4, 2018 where she teamed up with Raku as "Up Up Girls" in a losing against stablemates Pinano Pipipipi and Miu Watanabe in a tag team match. At TJPW 10 Vs. 10 - Red And White Winning Match on April 3, 2020, Noa competed in a twenty-woman tag team gauntlet match in which she teamed up with Haruka Neko, Mina Shirakawa, Mirai Maiumi, Miu Watanabe, Miyu Yamashita, Mizuki, Rika Tatsumi, Yuki Aino and Yuki Kamifuku as "Team White" to defeat "Team Red" ((Hyper Misao, Mahiro Kiryu, Maki Itoh, Nodoka Tenma, Pom Harajuku, Raku, Sena Shiori, Shoko Nakajima, Suzume and Yuna Manase). At TJPW Wrestle Princess on November 7, 2020, Noa unsuccessfully faced Yuki Kamifuku in the finals of a for the vacant International Princess Championship after she defeated Pom Harajuku and Mirai Maiumi in the previous phases.

Championships and accomplishments
Tokyo Joshi Pro Wrestling
International Princess Championship (1 time)
 Pro Wrestling Illustrated
Ranked No. 109 of the top 150 female singles wrestlers in the PWI Women's 150 in 2021

References 

1998 births
Living people
Japanese female professional wrestlers
People from Hokkaido